St James's House may refer to:

 St James's House, Birmingham, England
 St James House, Monmouth, Wales
 St. James House of Prayer Episcopal Church, Tampa, Florida, United States

See also 
 Saint James (disambiguation)